Arasawa No. 1 Dam  is a rockfill dam located in Iwate Prefecture in Japan. The dam is used for flood control. The catchment area of the dam is 19 km2. The dam impounds about 16  ha of land when full and can store 2139 thousand cubic meters of water. The construction of the dam was completed in 1972.

See also
List of dams in Japan

References

Dams in Iwate Prefecture